Mesoereis horianus is a species of beetle in the family Cerambycidae. It was described by Stephan von Breuning and Ohbayashi in 1966.

References

Mesosini
Beetles described in 1966